Adnan bin Abdullah bin Faris al Omari is a citizen of Saudi Arabia who was named on a list of Saudi Arabia's most wanted terrorist suspects.
The list of 36 names was published on June 28, 2005.
Saudi security officials reported he was transferred to Saudi Arabian custody in November 2005.

References

Living people
Saudi Arabian criminals
Year of birth missing (living people)
Named on Saudi Arabia's list of most wanted suspected terrorists